Kim Kyung-Hyun (born  in Ansan) is a South Korean bobsledder.

Kim competed at the 2014 Winter Olympics for South Korea. He teamed with driver Kim Dong-Hyun, Kim Sik and Oh Jea-Han as the South Korea-2 sled in the four-man event, finishing 28th.

Kim made his Bobsleigh World Cup debut in December 2013. As of April 2014, his best World Cup finish is 25th, in 2013-14 at Lake Placid.

References

1994 births
Living people
Olympic bobsledders of South Korea
People from Ansan
Bobsledders at the 2014 Winter Olympics
South Korean male bobsledders
Sportspeople from Gyeonggi Province